Dix infernal is the first album by Moi dix Mois and was released on March 19, 2003. 

"Tentation" and "Pessimiste" were re-recorded on the Dixanadu album.

Track listing

All songs written by Mana.

References 

2003 debut albums
Moi dix Mois albums